Bruce Oldfield, OBE (born 14 July 1950) is a British fashion designer, best known for his couture occasionwear. Notable clients have included Sienna Miller, Catherine Zeta-Jones, Diana Ross, Emmanuelle Seigner, Rihanna, Kelly Brook, Taylor Swift, Elizabeth McGovern, Rosamund Pike, Anjelica Huston, Faye Dunaway, Jacqueline Jossa, Melanie Griffith, Charlotte Rampling, Jerry Hall, Joan Collins, Diana, Princess of Wales, Queen Noor of Jordan, Queen Camilla, the Duchess of Edinburgh and Queen Rania of Jordan.

Early life
Oldfield was brought up and educated in the care of children's charity, Barnardo's (his father, whom he never knew, had migrated to Britain from Jamaica). Between the ages of 1 and 13, Oldfield was placed in foster care where he was brought up by a seamstress who sparked his love for designing and making clothes. 

In 1963, age the age of 13, Oldfield moved to West Mount, a Dr Barnardo's Children's Home, in Ripon. Four years later, Oldfield moved out of West Mount and lodged with a couple in Harrogate.

In 1961, Oldfield passed the 11-plus and began to attend Spennymoor Grammar School.  He was later educated at Ripon Grammar School, Sheffield City College of Education (now Sheffield Hallam University), and Ravensbourne College in London.

In 1973, he graduated from St. Martin's School of Art, London, to critical acclaim. That year he staged his first one-man show for Henri Bendel, later returning to London to show his first collection.

Career
In 1975 the Bruce Oldfield label was born with the launch of ready-to-wear collections for European and American stores. He began making couture clothes in 1978 for individual clients and from 1980 for Diana, Princess of Wales. In 1984 he opened his first shop selling ready-to-wear and couture to an international clientele. During the 1980s, he also designed shoes for couture house Rayne.

In 2009 he opened a second premises in Beauchamp Place dedicated to weddings, incorporating wedding dresses, veils, and a full range of bridal accessories.

In 1990, Oldfield was appointed an Officer of the Order of the British Empire (OBE) for services to the fashion industry; and in 2004 his autobiography Rootless was published. He has Honorary Fellowships to the Royal College of Art and the Universities of Durham and Sheffield, was Governor of The London Institute (1999–2001) and Trustee of the Royal Academy of Arts (2000–02).

In December 2001, Oldfield received an Honorary Doctorate of Civil Law (Hon DCL) from the University of Northumbria in Newcastle upon Tyne, and in 2005 an Honorary Doctorate from the University of Central England.  He is also a Vice-President of Barnardo's.

Today, couture, bridal and custom made, together with complementing accessories, can be found at 27 & 34 Beauchamp Place, London SW3. He redesigned the McDonald's staff uniform for 2008. Sophie, Countess of Wessex wore Bruce Oldfield to the 2011 Royal Wedding. In April 2013, Camilla, Duchess of Cornwall wore a pale powder-blue Bruce Oldfield dress to the inauguration ceremony for King Willem-Alexander of the Netherlands.

He is a supporter of the Conservative Party.

References

External links
 
 
 Biography at 100 Great Black Britons.com
 Portrait of Bruce Oldfield by John Swannell

1950 births
Living people
British fashion designers
Officers of the Order of the British Empire
English people of Jamaican descent
People educated at Ripon Grammar School
Alumni of Sheffield Hallam University
Black British fashion people
Alumni of Saint Martin's School of Art
Conservative Party (UK) people